Lesbian, gay, bisexual, and transgender (LGBT) persons in Zambia face legal challenges not faced by non-LGBT citizens. Same-sex sexual activity is illegal for both males and females in Zambia.
Formerly a colony of the British Empire, Zambia inherited the laws and legal system of its colonial occupiers upon independence in 1964. Laws concerning homosexuality have largely remained unchanged since then, and homosexuality is covered by sodomy laws that also proscribe bestiality. Social attitudes toward LGBT people are mostly negative and coloured by perceptions that homosexuality is immoral and a form of insanity.

LGBT persons are subjected to human rights violations by police and authorities. Subject to arbitrary arrest and detentions, they suffer violence and abuse in custody. Police are reported to threaten and extort LGBT persons. Those prosecuted for same-sex conduct are subjected to the use of forced anal examinations for evidence-gathering purposes. Such procedures are invasive and traumatic and are widely condemned by medical authorities and human rights groups; they are discredited for the purpose of providing any evidence of same-sex sexual activity. 

Other serious societal discrimination and abuse is directed towards LGBT persons. They may be targeted threats, stalking, vandalism, violence and other hate crimes, including murders. They routinely face community harassment and discrimination, with little recourse to assistance from police or government.

Law regarding same-sex sexual activity
Same-sex sexual activity is proscribed by Sections 155 and 156 of Zambia's penal code (as amended 1933 and repealed and replaced by Act No. 15 of 2005)

Section 155 ("Unnatural Offences") criminalises homosexual sex as a felony punishable by terms of imprisonment which range from fifteen years, up to a life sentence.
	

Section 156 imposes imprisonment for seven years for any attempt "to commit any of the offences specified in section one hundred and fifty-five". 

Although no specific criminal penalty is set out, Section 158, §(3) as amended in 2005, is to regulate any same-sex sexual contact between minors, applying to:

There is no similar legislative provision in the penal code that covers sexual conduct between minors of opposite sex.

Restrictions on advocacy
The Zambian government does not permit advocacy of LGBT rights; despite this, freedom of expression has been affirmed by the courts. Nevertheless, in their 2021 report, the bare conclusion of the U.S. Department of State was: "Freedom of expression or peaceful assembly on LGBTQI+ matters remained nonexistent."

In 1998, in a statement to the National Assembly of Zambia, Vice President Christon Tembo called for the arrest of individuals who promote gay rights, citing a need to "protect public morality". President Frederick Chiluba described homosexuality as "unbiblical" and "against human nature".
Later, Home Affairs Minister Peter Machungwa ordered the arrest of any individual or group attempting to formally register a gay rights advocacy group. Herbert Nyendwa, the Registrar of Societies, stated that he would refuse to register any LGBT organisation or civic group.

The People v. Paul Kasonkomona

The restrictions on advocating for LGBT rights were challenged in Zambia's courts in 2013, after a human rights activist appeared on TV talk show program. During the program, the activist called for the decriminalization of homosexuality in Zambia, the recognition of rights for sexual minorities, and HIV's spread to be combated among sexual minority groups. After the program, the activist was stopped by police, held in jail overnight, and accused of inciting the public to take part in indecent activities. The activist was later charged with "idle and disorderly conduct under Section 178(g) of the Penal Code, of the Laws of Zambia".

The activist challenged the charges in court by questioning three definitions to which he was charged: (1) "soliciting", (2) "public space" and 3 "immoral purposes". In the first level of court, the Magistrate Court, the judge ruled in favour of the activist and stated the activist's statements reflected an act of freedom of expression. The government challenged the decision.

In the High Court, the judiciary ruled that the government could not prove that the activist's participation in the debate could not be considered "soliciting" as the activists calls were not persistent and did not contain an element of pressure. The court agreed that the television program could be considered a "public place". The court did not agree with the government that the activist's statements were for "immoral purposes" as the activist was not encouraging people to engage in same sex activities but to protect people from harm. Additionally, the High Court further ruled that activist was reasonably exercising his right to freedom of expression.

Constitutional provisions

As many East and Southern African former British colonies have done, Zambia enacted its own constitution in the 1990s. This overrides much of the pre-1964 criminal code, and there are very broad protections against discrimination, with much of the language lifted from the UN Charter on Human Rights.

It can be argued that homosexuality is constitutionally protected under Article 23 of the 1996 Constitution. As constitutions override other laws, this may be why few, if any, prosecutions for homosexuality have taken place, as this would allow the relevant Criminal Code sections to be tested, and deleted if they are found to contravene the Constitution.

The Constitution of 1991, as amended by Act no. 17 of 1996, contains an anti-discrimination clause, present in Article 23 of the document. According to Article 23(1), "no law shall make any provision that is discriminatory either of itself or in its effect". Article 23(2) further prohibits discrimination "by any person acting by virtue of any written law or in the performance of the functions of any public office or any public authority", and Article 23(3) defines discrimination as extending to differential treatment of persons on the basis of "race, tribe, sex, place of origin, marital status, political opinions, color or creed". There is implicit but no explicit legal protection against discrimination based on sexual orientation and gender identity in the Zambian Constitution.

Legal action and reform 
Although Zambia has maintained a strict stance against any form of LGBT activity, there have been a number of efforts by the UN, to change its policies and law regarding same-sex activity. These efforts have been largely in vain as Zambia sustained its policies.

Zambian legal policies regarding same-sex activity have effectively bred a national environment of homophobia which has made it to where that the justice system severely disadvantages LGBT identifying individuals. The justice system fails to recognize and protect the lives of LGBT citizens which has in effect opened the window for citizen based-militia activity against LGBT individuals. The US Department of State's Human rights states that:the government enforces law that criminalizes homosexual conduct and did not respond to societal discrimination... according to LGBT advocacy groups, societal violence occurred, as did societal discrimination in employment, housing, and access to education or health care… LGBT groups reported frequent attacks and discrimination in the neighborhoods in which they operated. Activists reported regular harassment, including threats via text message and e-mail, vandalism, stalking, and outright violence.In April 2013, Paul Kasonkomona, a notable Zambian LGBT activist, was arrested for speaking about LBGT and HIV related issues on a local TV station. Kasonkomona was charged with the crime of "soliciting in a public place for immoral purpose." Also in 2013, two gay-identifying men were beaten outside of a nightclub after being found in a "compromising position". They decided against pressing charges out of the fear of being jailed themselves.

In May 2014, citizens of the Marapodi area of Lusaka apprehended two women who were suspected lesbians. They captured the women, brought them to the local police station, and demanded their arrest.

In January 2015, an openly gay man was attacked by a mob which reportedly included three police officers.

Zambia has abstained from/denied a number of reform efforts. In 2011, Zambia was one of three countries to abstain from a call from the Human Rights Council to prepare a report on the rights of its LGBT citizens. In a 2012 UPR review, Zambia rejected recommendations to repeal laws criminalizing same-sex relations. This followed a similar recommendation by the UPR in its 2008 review. The Zambian delegation provided the following in defense of their rejections:the Constitution making process will give the people the opportunity to determine whether specific rights for LGBT persons should be enshrined in the Constitution. The Government was determined not to prescribe to the Zambian people those rights that the Constitution should contain, but to let them make such a determination.However, in its 2018 review, Zambia noted the recommendations to decriminalize same-sex relations. Aside from this, no further actions have been made thus far.

Recognition of same-sex relationships

Zambia provides no recognition of same-sex couples. In 2006, Home Affairs Minister Ronnie Shikapwasha stated that Zambia would never legalize same-sex marriage, claiming that it is a sin that goes against the country's Christian status .
In February 2010, the National Constitutional Conference (NCC) unanimously agreed to adopt a clause that expressly forbids marriage between people of the same sex.

Living conditions
The U.S. Department of State's 2010 Human Rights Report found that "the government enforced the law that criminalizes homosexual conduct and did not respond to societal discrimination" and that "societal violence against homosexual persons occurred, as did societal discrimination in employment, housing, and access to education or health care."

Community attitudes
Zambia's societal attitudes towards homosexuality strongly reflect the influences of evangelical religions and historical colonial attitudes to homosexuality. Arguably the largest recipient of fundamentalist evangelical missionaries during British colonial times, such fundmentalist-style religious adherence is widespread in Zambia.

In 1999, the non-governmental organisation Zambia Against People with Abnormal Sexual Acts (ZAPASA) formed to combat homosexuality and homosexuals in Zambia.

A 2010 survey revealed that only 2% of Zambians find homosexuality to be morally acceptable, nine points below the figure recorded in Uganda (11% acceptance). In 2013, Christine Kaseba, the wife of former President Michael Sata, said that "silence around issues of men who have sex with men should be stopped and no one should be discriminated against on the basis of their sexual orientation."

Harassment and violence
According to a report submitted to the United Nations Human Rights Committee by Global Rights and the International Gay and Lesbian Human Rights Commission, the criminalization of consensual homosexual sex in Zambia "has a devastating impact on same-sex practicing people in Zambia". The report asserts that LGBT people are subject to arbitrary arrest and detention, "discrimination in education, employment, housing, and access to services", and extortion–often with the knowledge or participation of law enforcement authorities. The U.S. Department of State's 2021 Human Rights Practices Report for Zambia concurs, stating:

The report notes that LGBTQI+ advocacy groups advise that police regularly solicit bribes from arrested individuals for alleged same-sex activity. 

The research and advocacy group Human Rights Watch reports the use of forced anal examinations for police prosecutions, despite such procedures having no evidentiary value as to same-sex activity. The examinations are widely condemned as invasive and traumatic. They are viewed as abusive treatment by the World Health Organisation and medical authorities. In reporting a specific 2014 prosecution, Amnesty International described the treatment of the two men in the case, who were subjected to forced anal examinations as "tantamount to torture and scientifically invalid".

LGBTQI+ individuals are at risk of harassment in the community from threats, stalking, vandalism and even violence. According to a report by Behind the Mask, a non-profit organisation dedicated to LGBT affairs in Africa,
most LGBT people in Zambia are closeted due to fear of targeting and victimisation. Lesbians are especially vulnerable, according to the report, due to the patriarchal structure of Zambian society.

HIV/AIDS

As of July 2007, no public or private programmes provide HIV-related counselling to homosexual men in Zambia, where the HIV seroprevalence rate among adults is approximately 17%.
Although men involved in same-sex sexual relationships have a higher risk of HIV transmission, the government-operated National AIDS Control Program does not address same-sex relationships.

In June 2007, the Zambian Ministry of Health agreed to conduct, together with the Centers for Disease Control and Prevention and Society for Family Health under Population Services International, an assessment to evaluate HIV and AIDS prevalence and transmission among gay men.

Summary table

See also

 Human rights in Zambia
 LGBT rights in Africa

Notes

References

Further reading
 UK government travel advisory for Zambia: Local laws and customs
   [Anti-LGBT rights opinion column.]
  [Opinion piece arguing against same-sex marriage recognition.]
  Opinion column examining the potential for attitudinal change in conservative Christian clergy in Africa, and their positive engagement with LGBT persons:  This short article summarises the findings of the study:
  

Human rights in Zambia
Politics of Zambia
Law of Zambia
Zambia
LGBT in Zambia